Arnold's Bar and Grill is the oldest continuously operating bar in Cincinnati, Ohio, and one of the oldest in the United States.

History
Arnold's is the oldest continuously operating bar in the city and one of the oldest in the country.

The establishment was first opened in 1838 by Susan Fawcett as "a whorehouse," according to Cincinnati historian Mike Morgan. In 1861, new owner Simon Arnold operated it as a bar and lived upstairs. Around the year 1900, Simon Arnold's son Hugo took it over; he and his wife and six children also lived upstairs. Hugo Arnold added the building next door, which according to Cincinnati food historian Polly Campbell "allowed for a separate entrance and room for women." In the 1920s, Hugo Arnold's son Elmer Arnold took it over and, because of prohibition, started serving food. According to Campbell, Elmer Arnold was also "likely selling homemade gin". The Arnold family operated the bar through 98 years and three generations until 1959, when Elmer Arnold sold it to former professional wrestler and mob collector Jim Christakos, who also lived upstairs, and his brother George Christos.

In 1976, Cincinnati City Council member Jim Tarbell purchased it from Christakos (or possibly from an interim owner, Alex Chaldekas) and also moved in upstairs.  He expanded the bar to include a large outdoor courtyard. In 1998 longtime Arnold's server Ronda Breeden bought it to run with her son Chris Breeden. In 2019 Chris and Bethany Breeden took over ownership.

During prohibition the bar operated as a speakeasy. Some believe the building to be haunted.

The bathtub cart which fronts the building and is used in local parades refers to the second-floor bathtub which is reputed to have been used to make bathtub gin during prohibition. According to Campbell, the gin was likely made in the bathtub "because it was easy to pull the plug in case there was a raid."

In 2019 Arnold's partnered with local distillers Woodstone Creek to produce Hugo Arnold's Bathtub Gin, named for the prohibition-era owner of the bar.

In 2017 Arnold's allowed Cornerstone Paranormal to investigate staff and patron claims of paranormal activity on the property. Several odd and interesting findings were documented.

Reception

One of America's oldest bars, Arnold's is frequently named to national, state, and local lists. Esquire named it to their list of best bars in the country. Thrillist called it the "most iconic bar in Ohio" and named it to their list of best bars in the country. The Daily Meal named it one of the best bars in the country. Serious Eats named it to their list of 10 restaurants and bars to visit in Cincinnati.

Esquire's beverage historian David Wondrich stated that "if Arnold's were in New York, San Francisco, Chicago, or Boston – somewhere, in short, that people actually visit – it would be world-famous."

In their 2021 "Best of the City" issue Cincinnati Magazine states, "the legends of bathtub gin, paranormal activity, and mob connections are just a small part of why the city’s oldest—and perhaps most beloved—bar still draws a mighty crowd. Cincinnati Enquirer food critic Keith Pandolfi describes Arnold's as "part of the soul of Cincinnati".

Street art

In 2010 Shepard Fairey installed a 15-foot-tall by 20-foot-wide mural entitled "Global Warning" on Arnold's exterior wall. Fairey installed the mural as part of his show "Supply and Demand" at the Contemporary Arts Center that year. The mural is made from wheatpasted screen prints, which the bar has maintained.

In 2013 street artist JR installed a wheatpaste mural in Arnold's courtyard. The mural depicts Arnold's waitresses from the 1930s. JR installed the piece as part of his "Unframed" series, an ongoing project that began in 2010 using images by famous or anonymous photographers and archival images taken out of their context. JR has exhibited Unframed works in Cincinnati, Marseille, Atlanta, Washington DC, Baden Baden, Grottaglie, Vevey, and São Paulo.

In 2015 the artist Hargo (also known as Cash For Your Warhol) installed a mural on Arnold's exterior alley wall. Hargo installed the mural as part of his show "Cash For Your Warhol: Fund Your Startup!" being held at The BLDG in Covington, Kentucky.

In 2020 street artist Vhils installed a carved bas-relief mural portraying "Peanut Jim" Shelton in the courtyard.

In 2022 street artist and graphic designer, L'amour Supreme installed a spray painted mural on Arnold's exterior alley wall depicting his Czarface character. The mural was installed while he was in Cincinnati doing a much larger mural for the Blink light festival.

In popular culture

On television
In a 2018 Season 7 episode 12 of the Travel Channel's Man v. Food, host Casey Webb visits Arnold's during the episode's trip to Cincinnati.

Arnold's was featured on Season 3 Episode 1 of First We Feast's Hot Ones with host Sean Evans and guest Padma Lakshmi from Top Chef.

Producers for the NBC drama Harry's Law included the bar as a set on the show. They built a replica set of Arnold's as a hangout for the characters on the show. Even borrowing actual staff uniforms, table tents and copies of artwork to be used on the show. When the show was ultimately canceled, they sent actual set pieces to Arnold's which are displayed on the second floor of the bar.

Arnold's Bar and Grill's executive Chef, Kayla Robison appeared on Food Network's Guy's Grocery Games in 2019. Robison won the episode and was awarded the $20,000 prize without having to compete in the final. In March of 2022 Robison won an episode of Chopped.

In film
The 2015 film Carol, directed by Todd Haynes and nominated for 6 Academy Awards, was partially filmed at Arnold's. Cate Blanchett, Rooney Mara, Sarah Paulson and Jake Lacy were featured in scenes filmed at Arnold's.

The 2016 film Marauders, directed by Steven C. Miller, transformed Arnold's courtyard into a Mexican Cantina for filming. Scenes starring Christopher Meloni, Bruce Willis, and Adrian Grenier were filmed there.

The film 10 Minutes Gone (due in 2020), directed by Brian A. Miller, filmed scenes with Michael Chiklis at Arnold's.

In January 2023, Arnold's closed for several weeks to be used for the filming of Wise Guys, a gangster film starring Robert De Niro.

Awards and accolades
2018 The Daily Meal 150 Best Bars in America
2016 Serious Eats – The Cincinnati 10
2016 Whiskey Advocate Magazine – 48 Hours in Cincinnati
2015 The Daily Meal 150 Best Bars in America
2013 Esquire Magazine "Best Bars in America"
2013 Buzzfeed's Oldest and Coolest Bars
2001 Men's Journal Magazine "50 Best Bars in America"
2000 Travel and Leisure Magazine "Where to Go Next..."
1982 Post Corbett Awards Finalist
1979 Corbett Awards Finalist
1980 Addy American Advertising Federation
1980 Zagat Survey ~ America's Top Restaurants
Arnold's is a frequent winner of local alternative newspaper CityBeat's annual best-of lists such as Best Live Music While You Eat, Best No Frills Watering Hole, Best Business Lunch. Cincinnati magazine named Arnold's Cincinnati Dancing Pig burger one of the best in the city.

References

1861 establishments in Ohio
Restaurants in Cincinnati
Cuisine of Cincinnati
Restaurants established in 1861
Drinking establishments in Ohio
Brothels in the United States
Speakeasies
Reportedly haunted locations in Ohio